Three Blind Mice and Other Stories is a collection of short stories written by Agatha Christie, first published in the US by Dodd, Mead and Company in 1950. The first edition retailed at $2.50.

Stories from the collection later appeared in the British collections The Adventure of the Christmas Pudding (1960), Poirot's Early Cases (1974), Miss Marple's Final Cases and Two Other Stories (1979), and Problem at Pollensa Bay (1992). However, the title story, an alternate version of the play The Mousetrap, has not been published in book form in the UK.

Plot summaries

Three Blind Mice 

During a blinding snowstorm, a homicidal maniac traps a small group of people in an isolated boarding house. Giles and Molly Davis have just inherited Monkswell Manor from Molly’s Aunt Katherine, and they have decided to open it as a guest house. During a heavy blizzard, an intriguing cast of characters are trapped together, yet not everything is what it appears. After one of the guests is found dead, the question is, who is the killer? Well, it can only be someone on the inside. It is a tale of intrigue and murder coming from the past. Is everyone who they say they are? Who will live through the night? Will the murderer who kills to the tune of Three Blind Mice kill them all?

Characters:
 Mrs. Lyon
 Molly
 Giles
 Mrs. Boyle
 Christopher Wren
 Major Metcalf 
 Mr. Paravicini
 Detective Sergeant Trotter

Strange Jest 
During a party hosted by Miss Marple’s friend Jane Helier, Miss Marple is approached by a young couple who need her help. The couple was promised by their uncle that when he died they would inherit a great fortune. Yet, when the uncle died, he left them a letter telling them that their inheritance was hidden. The couple invites Miss Marple to their family home. She sets out to clear up the mystery and help this couple find their happiness.

Characters:
 Uncle Mathew
 Charmian Rossiter
 Edward Rossiter
 Miss Marple

The Case of the Perfect Maid 
Miss Marple comes to the aid of Inspector Slack once again. The Skinner sisters are a mystery to the village. While one sister lies around suffering from mysterious ailments, the other manages everything she needs. Then the sisters fire their maid, Gladys, claiming she is a thief, only to have things continue to disappear. Now the perfect maid has come to replace her, but when the perfect maid goes missing, who do you get to help solve the crime?

Characters:
 Edna
 Miss Marple
 Gladys Holmes
 Emily Skinner
 Lavinia Skinner
 Mary Higgins
 Mrs. Devereux
 Mrs. Carmichael

Tape-Measure Murder 
Miss Marple is called as a character witness for Mr. Spenlow, who is accused of murdering his wife. This is because Mr. Spenlow seems to be unaffected by the loss of his wife. With the help of her friend Colonel Melchett and the incredulous Inspector Slack, Miss Marple searches for the truth about who really killed Mrs. Spenlow. Will a man that Miss Marple feels is innocent hang for the crime?

Characters:
 Mrs. Spenlow
 Mr. Spenlow
 Miss Plotitt
 Mis Hartnell
 Miss Marple
 Police Constable Palk
 Inspector Slack
 Colonel Melchett

The Case of the Caretaker 
Doctor Haydock, the resident GP in the small village of St. Mary Mead, hopes to cheer up Miss Marple as she recovers from the flu. He feels the best solution is to give her a problem that will challenge her mind rather than her body. He decides to ask for her assistance in solving a murder because what better way was there to keep her spirits up than to find a killer. Harry Lexton, the devilishly handsome black sheep son, has made good and returned to his childhood home with his new wife to start a life. However, the villagers cannot stop talking about Harry’s past and at least one person cannot forgive him for tearing down the old house. When Harry’s new wife dies unexpectedly, was it a witch’s curse that did it or someone with darker plans?

Characters:
 Harry Lexton
 Louise Lexton
 Dr. Haydock
 Miss Marple
 Clarice Vane
 Mrs. Murgatroyd 
 Bella Edge

The Third Floor Flat 
A woman’s body is found in a flat. She was discovered by a group of four resourceful young people who had been locked out of their flat. Luckily for them, Hercule Poirot is nearby to lend his assistance. Who murdered this poor woman? Is there more to this story then meets the eye? Can Poirot discover the truth before it is too late for someone else?

Characters:
 Patricia Garnett
 Jimmy Faulkener
 Donovan Bailey
 Mildred Hope
 Hercule Poirot
 Mrs. Ernestine Grant
 Inspector Rice

The Adventure of Johnnie Waverly 
When a three-year-old child is kidnapped and held for ransom, Hercule Poirot must use his little gray cells to find the truth. Yet, when suspicion falls on the household, Poirot must face the difficult challenge of uncovering the location of the little boy.

Characters:
 Hercule Poirot
 Hastings
 Mrs. Waverly
 Mr. Waverly
 Miss Collins
 Inspector McNeil
 Johnnie Waverly  
 Tredwell

Four-and-Twenty Blackbirds 
Hercule Poirot is pulled into another mystery. While sitting down to dinner with an old friend, he notices the eating habits of one of the other patrons who the staff call “Old Father Time” as no one knows his name. He comes in every Tuesday and Thursday like clockwork, but one day he suddenly stops coming. Poirot believes he knows the truth behind the mystery, but could the truth be fatal?

Characters:
 Hercule Poirot 
 Henry Bonnington
 Molly
 Old Father Time
 Dr. MacAndrew
 Henry Gascoigne
 George Lorrimer
 Mr. Hill

The Love Detectives 
A messy love triangle ends in murder. Is the widowed wife and her lover really to blame? Mr. Satterthwaite teams up once again with the mysterious Mr. Harley Quin to discover why Sir James Dwight was murdered.

Characters:
 Mr. Satterthwaite
 Harley Quin
 Colonel Melrose
 Sir James Dwighton 
 Laura Dwighton
 Paul Delangua

Publication history
1950, Dodd, Mead and Company, hardback, 250 pp.
1952, Dell Books, paperback, 224 pp. (Dell number 633 [mapback])
1960, Dell Books, paperback, as The Mousetrap and Other Stories (Dell number D354)
1984, Berkley Books, paperback, 212 pp. (Berkley number 06806-4)

First publication of stories in the US
 The Adventure of Johnny Waverly: June 1925 (Volume XLI, Number 2) issue of the Blue Book Magazine with an uncredited illustration.
 The Love Detectives: October 30, 1926 (Volume XIX, Number 3) issue of Flynn's Weekly under the title "At the Crossroads" with uncredited illustrations.
 The Third Floor Flat: January 5, 1929 (Volume CVI, Number 6) issue of Detective Story Magazine under the title "In the Third Floor Flat" with an uncredited illustration.
 Four and Twenty Blackbirds: November 9, 1940 (Volume 106, Number 19) issue of Collier's magazine with illustrations by Mario Cooper.
 Strange Jest: November 2, 1941 issue of This Week under the title "A Case of Buried Treasure."
 The Tape-Measure Murder: November 16, 1941 issue of This Week with an illustration by Arthur Sarnoff.
 The Case of the Caretaker: July 5, 1942 edition of the Chicago Sunday Tribune.
 The Case of the Perfect Maid: September 13, 1942 edition of the Chicago Sunday Tribune.
 Three Blind Mice: May 1948 (Volume 124, Number 5) issue of Cosmopolitan magazine with uncredited illustrations.

Appearances in UK collections 
The four Miss Marple stories appeared in the 1979 collection Miss Marple's Final Cases and Two Other Stories. "The Third Floor Flat" and "The Adventure of Johnnie Waverly" appeared in the 1974 collection Poirot's Early Cases, while "Four and Twenty Blackbirds" appeared in the 1960 collection The Adventure of the Christmas Pudding. "The Love Detectives" appeared in the 1991 collection Problem at Pollensa Bay and Other Stories.

References

External links
Three Blind Mice and Other Stories at the official Agatha Christie website
Three Blind Mice and Other Stories
Three Blind Mice

1950 short story collections
Short story collections by Agatha Christie
Hercule Poirot short story collections
Miss Marple short story collections
Dodd, Mead & Co. books